The 2003 Men's Hockey Asia Cup was an international field hockey tournament held in Kuala Lumpur, Malaysia from 21 to 28 September 2003. It was the sixth time that the Men's Hockey Asia Cup was held since its inception back in 1982. The winner of the tournament qualified for the 2006 Men's Hockey World Cup in Germany.

Eight teams competed in the tournament with seven of them booking a spot via the host nation spot or by finishing in the top six of the previous tournament with the remaining spot being played between seven teams (which was won by Hong Kong). These eight teams were separated into two groups of four teams with the top two of each group qualifying through to the semi-finals while the bottom two competed for fifth place. After competing in the same group, India and Pakistan competed in the final with India taking out their first title with a 4–2 win. South Korea claimed the bronze medal after defeating Japan 4–2.

Results
All Pool Stage times are (UTC+8). All Knock Out matches are (IST).

Pools

Pool A

Pool B

Fifth to eighth place classification

5–8th place semi-finals

Seventh and eighth place

Fifth and sixth place

First to fourth place classification

Semi-finals

Third and fourth place

Final

Final standings

References

External links
 

2003
Men's Hockey Asia Cup
Men's Hockey Asia Cup
2003 Men's Hockey Asia Cup
Men's Hockey Asia Cup
September 2003 sports events in Asia
Asia Cup